Richard Lindley was an English professional footballer who played as an inside right.

Career
Born in Bolton, Lindley played for Burnley, Bradford City and Coventry City During his time with Bradford City he made 15 appearances in the Football League, scoring four goals.

Sources

References

Year of birth missing
Date of death missing
English footballers
Burnley F.C. players
Bradford City A.F.C. players
Coventry City F.C. players
English Football League players
Association football inside forwards
FA Cup Final players